Heathrow Terminals 1, 2, 3 can refer to the following:

Terminals at London Heathrow Airport
Terminal 1
Terminal 2
Terminal 3
Transit stations
Heathrow Terminals 1, 2, 3 tube station, serving the Piccadilly line of the London Underground
Heathrow Terminals 1, 2 and 3 railway station, serving Heathrow Express and Heathrow Connect